Parakh is a 1978 Pakistani Urdu film directed by Jan Mohammad Jumman. It starred Waheed Murad, Rani, Qavi, and Asif Khan in the lead cast. The story was written by Jalil Afghani and the screenplay and dialogues were penned by Bashir Niaz. Parakh was a golden jubilee hit at the box office.

Cast
 Rani
 Waheed Murad
 Asif Khan
 Usman Pirzada
 Naveen Tajik
 Nanha
 Qavi
 Tamanna
 Saqi
 Romana
 Jalil Afghani
 Rashid
 Dildar Pervaiz Bhatti

Release and box office
Parakh was released on 7 April 1978. The film completed 52 weeks at the main theaters and was crowned as a golden jubilee hit.

Music and soundtracks
The music of Parakh was composed by Kamal Ahmed and Taslim Fazli was the lyricist:
 Kisi Nay Kisi Ko Itna Nahin Chaha Ho Ga ... Singer(s): Mehnaz, Ghulam Abbas
 Ponchh Lay Aansoo In Ankhon Say ... Singer(s): A. Nayyar
 Rani O Rani, Sapno Ki Rani ... Singer(s): A. Nayyar
 Saathi Koi Aisa Milay ... Singer(s): A. Nayyar, Mehnaz

Awards
Parakh won a Nigar Award for the following category:

References

1978 films
Pakistani romantic musical films
1970s Urdu-language films
Nigar Award winners
Pakistani romantic drama films
Urdu-language Pakistani films